Victor Enok Nelsson (born 14 October 1998) is a Danish professional footballer who plays as a centre back for Süper Lig club Galatasaray and the Denmark national team.

Youth career
Nelsson started playing football when he was 4 years old in Hornbæk IF, where his father also was coaching. Later, he got contacted by scouts from FC Nordsjælland, and joined the club on 25 March 2010.

Club career

FC Nordsjælland
Nelsson got his debut for FC Nordsjælland on 12 September 2016. Having started on the bench, he replaced Mathias Jensen in the 87nd minute in a 3–1 defeat against AGF in the Danish Superliga. On 14 October 2016, Nelsson signed his first professional contract and was promoted to the first team squad. He played 23 league games for FCN in the 2016–17 season. Nelsson played the first two league games at the midfield, but then he was retrained as a centre back. He also became a regular starter from the 2017–18 season.

At the age of 19 and after a great period in the first half part of the 2017–18 season, Nelsson got called up to the Denmark B national team by Åge Hareide, so he could look him forward and consider to pick him to the A national team. In the winter break 2017–18, he changed his shirt number from 36 to 4.

FC Copenhagen
On 5 July 2019, Nelsson joined FC Copenhagen signing a contract until 2024.

Galatasaray
Galatasaray announced on 11 August 2021 that it had reached an agreement with Copenhagen for a transfer fee of €7 million to be paid within five years. In addition, according to the agreement, the unilateral release fee of the football player was determined as €25 million.

Career statistics

Club

Honours
Individual
UEFA European Under-21 Championship Team of the Tournament: 2021

References

External links
 
 

1998 births
Living people
People from Helsingør Municipality
Danish men's footballers
Association football forwards
Denmark international footballers
Denmark youth international footballers
Denmark under-21 international footballers
Danish Superliga players
Süper Lig players
FC Nordsjælland players
F.C. Copenhagen players
Galatasaray S.K. footballers
Danish expatriate men's footballers
Danish expatriate sportspeople in Turkey
Expatriate footballers in Turkey
Sportspeople from the Capital Region of Denmark
2022 FIFA World Cup players